Day's End is a 2021 architectural art piece steeped in ephemerality by the American conceptual and performance artist David Hammons. The ghostly architectural exoskeletal outline of a pier was commissioned by the Whitney Museum of American Art and inspired and created in tribute to the 1975 intervention instillation  piece Days End, Conical Intersect by Gordon Matta-Clark (1943 - 1978) where the "anarchitect" made five incisions into  pier 52 along the Hudson River (and today Hudson River Park) which stood on the same spot previously.

References

Further reading 

2021 sculptures
2021 in New York City